This is a list of songs recorded by Lucky Chops.

Official Releases

Songs not Officially Recorded 

Ska Ba
Longa
Mercy, Mercy, Mercy
Like Glue/Angel/All Star
Stand By Me
Treasure
"Sky Song" (original)
"Applebees" (original)
"Young One" (original)

External links 
 Official Website
 Official YouTube Channel

References 

Lists of songs by producer